Absurdistan is a fictitious country in which absurdity is the norm, especially in its public authorities and government.

Absurdistan may also refer to:

 Absurdistan (novel), a 2006 novel by Gary Shteyngart
 Absurdistan (film), a 2008 film directed by Veit Helmer
 Absurdistan, a 2002 album by Ada Milea
 Absurdistan, a 1997 album by Laika & the Cosmonauts

See also
 Apsurdistan, a 2013 album by Dubioza Kolektiv